Tyger Campbell (born January 9, 2000) is an American college basketball player for the UCLA Bruins of the Pac-12 Conference. Three times he has earned first-team all-conference honors in the Pac-12.

High school career
Campbell is the son of Jennifer and Tony Campbell, who played basketball at Luther College. They named their son after Tiger Woods. Campbell grew up in Cedar Rapids, Iowa. He attended La Lumiere School in La Porte, Indiana, which he credits for his "entry into manhood", adding, "it’s a place where you can learn how to be a good teammate." In his sophomore season, he led La Lumiere to the Dick's Sporting Goods championship and a 29–1 record while averaging 11.3 points and 7.8 assists per game. Following his sophomore season, Campbell reclassified to the class of 2018 because he was ahead academically and felt he was ready for college basketball. As a senior, Campbell averaged 15.5 points and 7.2 assists per game. Campbell initially committed to DePaul on May 8, 2017, but he withdrew his commitment in September. In February 2018, he signed with UCLA.

College career

During a practice before the start of his freshman season, Campbell suffered a knee injury. An MRI revealed it was a torn ACL, and he was forced to sit out the season in which the Bruins finished 17–16. He was cleared to play in September 2019 but was forced to wear a knee brace for a few months. In his collegiate debut on November 9, Campbell scored 15 points in a 69–65 win over Long Beach State. On February 3, 2020, Campbell scored a season-high 22 points in a win over Utah. This performance was a part of a three-game run in which Campbell averaged 15.7 points per game, which he credited to coach Mick Cronin urging him to be more aggressive offensively. After posting his first double-double of 15 points and 11 assists in a 70–63 win over Colorado, Campbell was named Pac-12 freshman of the week on February 24. As a redshirt freshman, Campbell averaged 8.3 points and 5.0 assists per game.

In 2020–21, Campbell scored 22 points in a road win against Arizona for UCLA's fourth straight win on their rivals' court. Among the conference leaders in both assists and assist-turnover ratio, he was a first-team All-Pac-12 selection. Campbell averaged 10.4 points and 5.4 assists per game as a sophomore, shooting 42.9 percent from the field.

In 2021–22, Campbell was named the Pac-12 Player of the Week for the week ending January 9, 2022. He led UCLA to a 2–0 record while averaging 14 points along with seven assists per game and shooting 61 percent, including 5-of-8 on his three-point field goals. He had worked on his 3-point shooting over the summer after making just 25.9% of his shots in his first two seasons. On February 13, he scored a career-high 27 points in a 67–64 loss to USC. He was named again to the All-Pac-12 first team. He was also one of five finalists for the Bob Cousy Award, given to the top point guard in the country. In the opener of the 2022 NCAA tournament, Campbell scored a team-high 16 points, including eight of the Bruins' final 10 points, in a 57–53 comeback win over 13th-seeded Akron.

As a senior in 2022–23, Campbell was named to the 10-player midseason watch list for the Cousy Award. He earned his third consecutive first-team All-Pac-12 selection, and received honorable mention as an All-American from the Associated Press.
In the semifinals of the Pac-12 tournament, he scored 20 of his career-high 28 points in the second half in a win over Oregon.

Career statistics

College

|-
| style="text-align:left;"| 2018–19
| style="text-align:left;"| UCLA
| style="text-align:center;" colspan="11"|  Redshirt
|-
| style="text-align:left;"| 2019–20
| style="text-align:left;"| UCLA
| 31 || 31 || 30.0 || .358 || .267 || .674 || 2.4 || 5.0 || .8 || .0 || 8.3
|-
| style="text-align:left;"| 2020–21
| style="text-align:left;"| UCLA
| 32 || 32 || 33.7 || .429 || .250 || .772 || 2.1 || 5.4 || 1.1 || .0 || 10.4
|-
| style="text-align:left;"| 2021–22
| style="text-align:left;"| UCLA
| 33 || 33 || 32.4 || .444 || .410 || .838 || 2.5 || 4.3 || 1.0 || .1 || 11.9
|- class="sortbottom"
| style="text-align:center;" colspan="2"| Career
| 96 || 96 || 32.0 || .414 || .324 || .759 || 2.3 || 4.9 || 1.0 || .1 || 10.2

Source:

References

External links

UCLA Bruins bio

2000 births
Living people
American men's basketball players
Basketball players from Iowa
La Lumiere School alumni
Point guards
Sportspeople from Cedar Rapids, Iowa
UCLA Bruins men's basketball players